The Upper Rhine is the section of the Rhine between Basel in Switzerland and Bingen in Germany, surrounded by the Upper Rhine Plain. The river is marked by Rhine-kilometres 170 to 529 (the scale beginning in Konstanz and ending in Rotterdam).

The Upper Rhine is one of four sections of the river (the others being the High Rhine, Middle Rhine and Lower Rhine) between Lake Constance and the North Sea. The countries and states along the Upper Rhine are Switzerland, France (Alsace) and the German states of Baden-Württemberg, Rhineland-Palatinate and Hesse. The largest cities along the river are Basel, Mulhouse, Strasbourg, Karlsruhe, Mannheim, Ludwigshafen and Mainz.

The Upper Rhine was straightened between 1817 and 1876 by Johann Gottfried Tulla and made navigable between 1928 and 1977. The Treaty of Versailles allows France to use the Upper Rhine for hydroelectricity in the Grand Canal d'Alsace.

On the left bank are the French region of Alsace and the German state of Rhineland-Palatinate; on the right bank are the German states of Baden-Württemberg and Hesse.  The first few kilometres are in the Swiss city of Basel.

Geology 

This was due to tensile stresses in the Earth's crust and mantle, which resulted in lowering the earth's surface. The moat has been partially filled up again by sedimentation. On the edges we find mountain ridges, the so-called "rift flanks". On the eastern side, they are the Black Forest and Odenwald mountains, in the west the Vosges and Palatinate Forest. During the Tertiary, the High Rhine continued west from Basel and flowed via the Doubs and the Saône, into the Rhône. The rift diverted the Rhine into the newly formed Upper Rhine Valley.

The Rhine knee at Basel marks the transition from the High Rhine to the Upper Rhine with a change of direction from West to North and a change of landscape from the relatively small-chamber high-Rhine cuesta landscape to the wide rift zone of the Upper Rhine Rift Valley.  The two largest tributaries come from the right: the Neckar in Mannheim, the Main across from Mainz.  In the northwest corner of the Upper Rhine Valley, at Rhine-kilometre 529.1, near Bingen, where the Nahe flows into the Rhine, the Rhine flows into a gorge in the Rhenish Massif and thereby changes into the Middle Rhine.

Straightening 
In 1685, Louis XIV started a project to move the Upper Rhine, change its course and drain the floodplain, in order to gain land. Around 1790, large parts of the Rhine Valley were deforested, creating arable land, fields and pasture to feed the population. The Upper Rhine was straightened between 1817 and 1876 by Johann Gottfried Tulla and changed from a relatively sluggish meandering river with major and many smaller branches into a fast flowing stream flanked by embankments.

Canalising and dams 
The Rhine between Basel and Iffezheim is almost entirely canalised. Between Basel and Breisach, the old river bed carries hardly any water; almost all water is diverted through the Grand Canal d'Alsace on the French side, to ensure safe shipping and hydropower generation around the clock. Only when there is a large supply of water, then the old river bed will receive more water than the canal. France gained the right to do this in the 1919 Treaty of Versailles; the right applies to the segment between Basel and Neuburgweier/Lauterbourg, where the Rhine forms the border between France and Germany.

Gravel is also missing from the river, due to the dams. This has caused erosion below the dam at Iffezheim.

Conservation 
The floodplains between Mainz and Bingen are important for nature conservation.  In this section, the so-called Island Rhine, there are many nature reserves and bird sanctuaries.

Integrated Rhine Programme (IRP) 
The Upper Rhine plays a key role in flood control on the Middle and Lower Rhine.  As a result of the straightening of the Upper Rhine, floods from the Alps now reach the Middle Rhine much faster than in the past.  Thus, the risk of such a peak coinciding with a flood peak of Neckar, Moselle or Main has increased.  About  of floodplain have been lost.  Authorities in riparian states of France, Baden-Württemberg and Rhineland-Palatinate have launched the Integrated Rhine Programme, a framework for designating water retention areas. to combat downstream flooding.  A French-German treaty was concluded in 1982, in which the parties agreed to restore the retention capacity on the stretch below Iffezheim to the level it had before the area was developed.

This means:

For this purpose the following measures are planned and partially implemented:
 By France: Special operations power stations on the Rhine and construction of two polders Erstein and Moder
 By Baden-Württemberg: construction of about 13 polders
 By Rhineland-Palatinate: construction of polders and relocating levees

The effectiveness of the flood protection measures was verified using a computer model.  The State Institute for the Environment, Nature Protection and Measurements in Baden-Württemberg carried out forecast calculations with the help of a mathematical "synoptic flood progression model".  The analysis of the calculations and the evaluation of the results were made on the basis of the requirements and methods set by the international Flood Study Commission for the Rhine.  The implementation of the proposed flood control measures on the Upper Rhine can prevent the occurrence of a 200-year-flood between Iffezheim and Bingen, with an overall economic loss estimated at around 6.2 billion euros.

Tri-national metropolitan region 

The Upper Rhine tri-national region (French: Région Métropolitaine Trinationale du Rhin Supérieur, German: Trinationale Metropolregion Oberrhein) is a Euroregion that covers the border areas of the Upper Rhine (the northern part of the Upper Rhine valley and the Palatinate are not included as they are not border areas) and parts of the High Rhine. As the name suggests, it is a tri-national region comprising parts of France, Germany and Switzerland. The regional Upper Rhine Conference is a framework for future political and administrative cooperation in the area.

See also 
 Upper Rhine aquifer
 Upper Alsace

References 
 Dieter Balle: Kultur- und Naturführer Oberrhein. Zwischen Mannheim und Basel, Verlag Regionalkultur, Ubstadt-Weiher 2007. 
 Manfred Bosch: Oberrheingeschichten, Verlag Klöpfer und Meyer, 2010, 384 pages,  (an anthology)
 Upper Rhine Agency: Rahmenkonzept des Landes Baden-Württemberg zur Umsetzung des Integrierten Rheinprogramms. Part I Wiederherstellung des Hochwasserschutzes, Part II Erhaltung und Renaturierung der Auelandschaft am Oberrhein. Materialien zum integrierten Rheinprogramm. Lahr, September, 1996
 Ministry of Environment Baden-Württemberg: Das Integrierte Rheinprogramm: Hochwasserschutz und Auenrenaturierung am Oberrhein, Stuttgart, May, 2007
 Water and Shipping Directorate South West: Kompendium der Wasser- und Schifffahrtsdirektion Südwest.  Organizational and technical data, inland navigation, duties, waterways.  Self-published, June 2007

Footnotes

External links 

 Official tourism website of the Upper Rhine Valley
 EUCOR-URGENT
 Franco-German-Swiss Conference of the Upper Rhine
 Regional Association of the Southern Upper Rhine
 RegionalverRegional Association of the Central Upper Rhine
 Association for Regional History in the Upper Rhine area
 Information on the Integrated Rhine Programme from the government office in Freiburg
 Water Management Administration of Rhineland-Palatinate
 Gauge station Maxau
 The floodplain north of Strasbourg

 
Rhine, Upper
Rhine, Upper
 
Rivers of Baden-Württemberg
Rivers of Hesse
Rivers of Rhineland-Palatinate
Rhine
Federal waterways in Germany
Ramsar sites in Germany
Ramsar sites in Metropolitan France
Rivers of Basel-Stadt
Rivers of Grand Est
Rivers of Bas-Rhin
Rivers of Germany